Steve Latshaw (b 1959) is an American screenwriter, producer and director. He has written a number of films for Jim Wynorski and Fred Olen Ray.

He began his career working in television. He started making films with Fred Olen Ray in Florida. He moved to Hollywood in 1995.

Select filmography
Dark Universe (1993)
Biohazard: The Alien Force (1994) - writer, producer
Jack-O (1995) - director, co-producer
 (2001) - writer
Gale Force (2001) - writer
Return of the Killer Shrews (2012) - writer, director

References

External links

American directors
American screenwriters
American film producers
1959 births
Living people